Ayman Asfari (born 8 July 1958) is a Syrian-born British businessman. He was the chief executive (CEO) of Petrofac, a Jersey-registered multinational oilfield services company serving the oil, gas and energy production and processing industries, from 2002 to 2020, and became a non-executive director.

Early life
Asfari was born in Syria, the son of a diplomat, but raised outside the country. His first job was in Oman, as a consulting engineer carrying out soil testing.

He is a graduate of Villanova University in Pennsylvania in the United States, and holds an MSc in Civil and Urban Engineering from the University of Pennsylvania. He attended the Wharton School of the University of Pennsylvania for his MBA.

Career
Before joining Petrofac, Asfari served as the managing director of a major Oman-based civil and mechanical construction business. He joined Petrofac in 1991 when it had one plant in Tyler, Texas. He bought out the company in 2001, and took it public on the London Stock Exchange in 2005.

In February 2015, Forbes calculated Asfari's net worth at $1.2 billion. Asfari won the UK category of the Ernst & Young Entrepreneur of the Year Awards in 2011.

In 2019, Asfari's paycheck from Petrofac was cut by 45% to £980,000, down from £1.8 million in 2018. He stood down as CEO on 31 December 2020, and became a non-executive director in January 2021.

Political and charitable donations
The Asfari Foundation was established in 2006 by Ayman and Sawsan Asfari and is based in London. It is funded by the Asfari family and has five trustees. The foundation supports projects that encourage the development of civil society and provide emergency humanitarian relief, and also offers academic scholarships.

In May 2017, Asfari and his wife donated £100,000 to the British Conservative Party election campaign, days before Asfari was scheduled to be interviewed by the Serious Fraud Office relating to its enquiry into Unaoil. In total Ayman and Sawsan Asfari donated £794,000 to the party between 2009 and 2017.

References

1958 births
Living people
Syrian businesspeople
British chief executives
British corporate directors
Villanova University alumni
Wharton School of the University of Pennsylvania alumni
Syrian billionaires
British billionaires
Syrian emigrants to the United Kingdom
Conservative Party (UK) donors
Syrian chief executives
Carnegie Endowment for International Peace
People from Idlib
Asfari family